GN-z11 is a high-redshift galaxy found in the constellation Ursa Major. It was among the farthest known galaxies from Earth ever discovered. The 2015 discovery was published in a 2016 paper headed by Pascal Oesch and Gabriel Brammer (Cosmic Dawn Center).

The object's name is derived from its location in the GOODS-North field of galaxies and its high cosmological redshift number . It is observed as it existed 13.4 billion years ago, just 400 million years after the Big Bang; as a result, its distance is sometimes inappropriately reported as 13.4 billion light-years, its light-travel distance measurement.

The galaxy has such a high redshift that its angular diameter distance is actually less than that of some galaxies with lower redshift. This means that the ratio of its angular size to its size in light-years is greater.

Discovery
The galaxy was identified by a team studying data from the Hubble Space Telescope's Cosmic Assembly Near-infrared Deep Extragalactic Legacy Survey (CANDELS) and Spitzer Space Telescope's Great Observatories Origins Deep Survey-North (GOODS-North). The research team used Hubble's Wide Field Camera 3 to measure the distance to GN-z11 spectroscopically, measuring the redshift caused by the expansion of the universe. The findings, which were announced in March 2016, revealed the galaxy to be farther away than originally thought, at the distance limit of what the Hubble Telescope can observe. GN-z11 is around 150 million years older than the previous record-holder EGSY8p7, and is observed (shortly after but) "very close to the end of the so-called Dark Ages of the universe", and (during but) "near the very beginning" of the reionization era.

With a stellar age estimated at 40 million years, it appears the galaxy formed its stars relatively rapidly. The fact that a galaxy so massive existed so soon after the first stars started to form is a challenge to some current theoretical models of the formation of galaxies.

See also
 CEERS-93316
 GLASS-z12
 HD1 galaxy
 List of the most distant astronomical objects

Notes

References

20160303
Ursa Major (constellation)
Dwarf irregular galaxies